Ivano Comba (24 August 1960 – 2 February 2022) was an Italian professional footballer who played as a defender for Ternana and Spezia. He died on 2 February 2022, at the age of 61.

References

1960 births
2022 deaths
Italian footballers
Ternana Calcio players
Spezia Calcio players
Piacenza Calcio 1919 players
S.P.A.L. players
S.S. Formia Calcio players
Serie A players
Serie B players
Association football defenders
Juventus F.C. players
A.C.D. Sant'Angelo 1907 players
Pinerolo F.C. players